Werner Nahm (born 21 March 1949) is a German theoretical physicist, with the status of professor. He has made contributions to mathematical physics and fundamental theoretical physics.

Life and work 

Werner Nahm attended Gymnasium Philippinum Weilburg. After high school he studied from 1966 at the Johann Wolfgang Goethe-Universität Frankfurt am Main and the Ludwig-Maximilians-Universität München, where he earned his diploma in physics in 1970. He received his doctorate in 1972 at the University of Bonn, his dissertation was titled Analytical solution of the statistical bootstrap model, where he was then to 1975 as a post-doctoral student. From 1976 to 1982 he was a scientist at CERN.

From 1982 he was a Heisenberg fellow again at the University of Bonn. In 1986 he became associate professor at the University of California, Davis. 1989 to 2002 he was a full professor at the University of Bonn. Since 2002 he is one of three senior professors at the School of Theoretical Physics at the Dublin Institute for Advanced Studies and since 2007 its director. He is a foreign member of the Max Planck Institute for Mathematics in Bonn.

In the 1970s he worked with elementary theory, for example, bootstrap models (the subject of his dissertation) and the classification of graded Lie algebras, which are important in supersymmetric theories. After that, he worked mainly on the theory of magnetic monopoles, classification of supersymmetric models, conformal field theories and their algebraic classification, and classification of string models. The Nahm equations (1981) are named after him, used in (for example) for the description of monopoles in Yang–Mills theories, and the Nahm transform.

In 1978 he showed that the maximum dimension of supersymmetric theories was d = 11. His predicted d = 11 supergravity theory was constructed shortly after by Eugène Cremmer, Bernard Julia and Joël Scherk. Since supersymmetric theories are now favoured in the context of Kaluza–Klein theories as candidates for unified field theories of elementary particles (M theory), Nahm also determined the maximum number of eligible space-time dimensions.

Nahm also conducted research about the Mayan civilisation and their astronomy, for example, the role of Venus (and their phases) in terms of calendar prediction that was important for their planning of wars. In his Mayan research, he also worked with Linda Schele and Nikolai Grube and participated in the ongoing decipherment of Maya hieroglyphs. He also found evidence of supernova events and the observation of Mercury in the Mayan writings.

His doctoral and diploma students include , Melanie Becker, Ralph Blumenhagen, Sayipjamal Dulat, Michael Flohr, Andreas Honecker, Ralph Kaufmann, Johannes Kellendonk, Andreas Malmendier, Andreas Recknagel, Daniel Roggenkamp, and Katrin Wendland in academia, and Holger Eberle, Wolfgang Eholzer, Michael Terhoeven, and Raimund Varnhagen in industry.

Other affiliations 

Member of the Royal Irish Academy
Member of the Academy of Sciences and Literature Mainz
Member (Fellow) of the Royal Society

Prizes and awards 

2012 Gothenburg Lise Meitner Prize of TH Chalmers
2013 Max Planck Medal
2014 Royal Irish Academy Gold Medal in Physical and Mathematical Sciences

Works

References

External links 

 
 "Professor Werner Nahm FRS Royal Society
 
 Scientific publications of Werner Nahm on INSPIRE-HEP

1949 births
Living people
Theoretical physicists
Particle physicists
21st-century German physicists
People associated with CERN
Fellows of the Royal Society
Winners of the Max Planck Medal
20th-century German physicists
Academics of the Dublin Institute for Advanced Studies